John Spanos (born 4 January 1961) is an Australian former soccer player who played in the National Soccer League.

Playing career

Club career
Spanos played junior football for Ascot and Morley-Windmills before stints with Sydney City, Heidelberg United, Marconi and Blacktown City in the National Soccer League.

International career
Spanos made one appearance for Australia against Indonesia in 1980.

References

1961 births
Living people
Sydney City players
Heidelberg United FC players
Marconi Stallions FC players
Blacktown City FC players
Australian soccer players
Australia international soccer players
Footballers from Leeds
Association football defenders